Louie Mark Barry (born 21 June 2003) is an English professional footballer who plays as a striker and winger for EFL League Two club Salford City, on loan from Premier League club Aston Villa.

Having spent a decade in the West Bromwich Albion Academy he moved to Barcelona in 2019, becoming the first English player to join and play for the La Masia academy. He subsequently joined the Aston Villa Academy in January 2020. Barry has represented both England and the Republic of Ireland at youth international level.

Early and personal life
Barry was born in Sutton Coldfield, and has dual British and Irish citizenship. He attended Bishop Walsh Catholic School. In February 2020, he said that he had been an Aston Villa fan his entire life.

Barry is of no relation to the former Aston Villa player Gareth Barry.

Club career

Early career 
Barry played for local Sutton Coldfield side, Sutton United as an under-8 where he played with future teammate Tim Iroegbunam. Barry joined the West Bromwich Albion academy at the age of six and by 2018, had progressed to the U21 squad.

Barcelona 
After spending ten years with West Bromwich Albion, Barry signed a three-year contract with Spanish club Barcelona in July 2019. He had previously been close to signing for French club Paris Saint-Germain. He became the first English player to join La Masia. In September 2019 it was announced that Albion were going to report Barcelona to FIFA over the transfer, claiming that they had not received the compensation they were due. Barcelona contested this, however, stating that they did not believe that his scholarship for Albion had any international standing, and that they would wait for the verdict from FIFA. He subsequently had to wait three months for his international registration to be confirmed which meant he missed the first seven matches of the Barcelona under-19 season. A judge ultimately ruled in favour of Barcelona and in November 2021 stated that Albion were due no further compensation.

Barry made his debut for Barcelona's under-19 side in October 2019, scoring on his first start, in a 6–0 victory against Ebro. He made ten competitive under-19 appearances in the league and UEFA Youth League for Barcelona in the 2019–20 season, scoring twice. His side were declared U19 league champions in May 2020, a few months after Barry left the club, after the COVID-19 pandemic curtailed the youth season.

Aston Villa 
In January 2020 he held talks with Aston Villa, signing for them later that month for a fee of £880,000, which could rise to £3.5m with add-ons. Barry signed a three-year contract, as this is the maximum allowed for a player of his age – with an agreement of an automatic further three years at the end of that. He made his debut for the club's U23 team on 23 January, shortly before he was officially unveiled by the Midlands club. He came on to score the equaliser in a 2–1 win over Cardiff City. In June he spent time training with the Aston Villa first team, then made a first appearance in the EFL Trophy with the club's under-21 side four months later.

On 8 January 2021, after ten of Villa's first-team players tested positive for COVID-19, Barry was selected to make his debut in the FA Cup third round against Liverpool. Barry scored to equalise the game at 1–1, before Liverpool went on to win 4–1. Barry's performance prompted the Liverpool manager, Jürgen Klopp, to refer to the youngster as "Little Jamie Vardy" The goal was voted 'Goal of the Round' by BBC Sport readers. On 24 May, Barry was part of the Aston Villa U18 squad that won the FA Youth Cup, beating Liverpool U18s 2–1 in the final. On 7 July, Villa announced that they had exercised an option in Barry's contract to automatically extend it until 2024.

Ipswich Town loan 
On 6 August 2021, Barry signed for League One side Ipswich Town on a season-long loan. He made his debut on 10 August, in a 1–0 EFL Cup defeat to Newport County. He made his Football League debut four days later in a 2–1 defeat at Burton Albion. After finding game time limited at Ipswich, Barry returned to Villa in January, having made 6 appearances during his loan.

Swindon Town loan 
On 28 January 2022, Barry signed for League Two side Swindon Town on loan for the remainder of the season. He made his debut on 1 February, as a second half substitute in a 1–1 draw against Crawley Town. On 19 February, he scored his first senior league goal, in a 3–0 away victory over Carlisle United.

Milton Keynes Dons loan 
On 12 July 2022, Barry joined League One club Milton Keynes Dons until the end of the 2022–23 season. He made his debut on 30 July 2022 as a 61st-minute substitute in a 1–0 defeat away to Cambridge United.

Salford City loan
On 30 January 2023, Barry had his Milton Keynes Dons loan terminated, to facilitate a loan move to Salford City until the end of the season.

International career
Barry has represented England at under-15, under-16 and under-17 youth levels. He is also eligible to represent the Republic of Ireland, and has represented them at under-15 and under-16 level in 2018 before returning to play for England youth sides. In 2018 Barry scored ten goals in five games for the England under-15 side at a tournament in Italy.

In 2019 Barry was part of the England under-17 side that were victorious in the Syrenka Cup, he started the final and assisted Jamal Musiala for one of England's goals against hosts Poland, a 2–2 draw which England subsequently won on penalties.

By February 2020 he had scored 21 goals in 20 games for England's youth teams.

On 29 March 2021, Barry made his debut for England U18s during a 2–0 win away to Wales at the Leckwith Stadium.

Career statistics

Honours
Barcelona U19
División de Honor Juvenil: 2019–20

Aston Villa U18
 FA Youth Cup: 2020–21

England U16
Tournoi Val-de-Marne: 2018

England U17
Syrenka Cup: 2019

Individual
Tournoi Val-de-Marne – Top Goalscorer: 2018
Premier League 2 – Player of the Month: January 2021

References

External links 

2003 births
Living people
Sportspeople from Sutton Coldfield
English footballers
England youth international footballers
Republic of Ireland association footballers
Republic of Ireland youth international footballers
Association football forwards
Association football wingers
West Bromwich Albion F.C. players
FC Barcelona players
Aston Villa F.C. players
Ipswich Town F.C. players
Swindon Town F.C. players
Milton Keynes Dons F.C. players
Salford City F.C. players
English expatriate footballers
Expatriate footballers in Spain
English expatriate sportspeople in Spain
English people of Irish descent
English Football League players